This is a list of military light utility vehicles, of the kind commonly referred to as jeeps, and typically classified as -ton payload rated, manufactured by U.S. automakers, in order of first creation.

World War II

 1940 Bantam Pilot—Prototype
 1940 Bantam BRC-60—Prototype
 1940 Willys Quad—Prototype
 1940 Ford Pygmy—Prototype
 1940 Budd Ford—Prototype
 1941 Ford GP
 1941 Willys MA
 1941 Bantam BRC-40
 1941 Willys T13/T14 'Super Jeep' – MB stretched to 6x6 and armed with a 37 mm Gun Motor Carriage. Although cancelled in favor of the M6 Gun Motor Carriage, the T14 was developed into the MT-TUG cargo/prime mover.
 1941-1944 Willys MT "Super Jeep" — 6x6, 3⁄4-ton prototype — a small number were built in various configurations. Although performance was excellent, the MT was deemed "surplus to requirements" and cancelled in favor of existing -ton and 1 -ton trucks.
 1942 Willys MB (slat grille)
 1942 T24 Scout Car – MT-based armored car. Although it performed well in trials, the T24 was abandoned in favor of the M8 and M20 Light Armored Car.
 1942–1943 Ford GTB 1-ton 4x4 'Burma Jeep'
 1942–1945 Willys MB (stamped grille)
 1942–1945 Ford GPW
 1943 Willys T28 – half-track based on the MT
 1943 Willys WAC (for 'Willys Air Cooled') "Jeeplet" — prototype for a super light-weight, fulltime 4WD with front and rear independent suspension
 1944 Willys MLW-1 (for 'Military Long Wheelbase') — prototype (never finished)
 1944 Willys MLW-2 (for 'Military Long Wheelbase') or "Jungle Jeep" — prototype for a half-ton, jungle-suited jeep

Post World War II
 1949–1952 M38 (Willys MC)

 1950 CJ V-35(/U) – deep water fording Willys CJ-3A; 1000 units built for the USMC 
 1952–1957 M38A1 (Willys MD)
 1952–1957 M38A1C fitted with 105/106mm anti-tank recoilless rifle
 M170 Ambulance
 1953 Willys BC Bobcat aka "Aero Jeep" — Prototype for a very small, lightweight (1475 lbs) jeep, for easier lifting by contemporaneous helicopters, eventually rejected in favor of AMC's M422 design.
 1955 M38A1D – a small number of M38A1s carried the M28 or M29 "Davy Crockett Weapon System", the US' smallest tactical nuclear weapon, fired from a 120mm or 155mm recoilless rifle
 1956–1968 Jeep M606

 1959–1962 AMC M422 Mighty Mite
 1960–1982 Ford M151
 1960–1964 M151
 M718 Ambulance
 1964–1970 M151A1
 M151A1C Weapons Platform
 1970–1982 M151A2
 M718A1 Ambulance
 M825 Weapons Platform

Jeep-related vehicles unlike the jeep vehicle-concept

The U.S. has also used military vehicles that are directly related to jeeps, or were Willys / Jeep branded, but that digress significantly from the jeep vehicle-concept:

The amphibious jeep (WW II)
 1942–1943 Ford GPA – an amphibious hulled vehicle, similar to the DUKW, but mechanically a Ford GPW jeep

Willys / Jeep branded, but not jeep-like vehicles
 1956–1965 Jeep Forward Control military variants
 M676 Truck, Cargo Pickup
 M677 Truck, Cargo Pickup w/4 Dr. Cab
 M678 Truck, Carry All
 M679 Truck, Ambulance
 1958-1960 Willys XM443 / M443E1 "Super Mule" – prototypes for 3⁄4-ton, underfloor mid-engined platform-trucks, comparable to but larger than the M274 "Mechanical Mule". Never entered production due to reliability problems.
 1967–1969 M715 Truck — based on the commercial Kaiser Jeep Gladiator

References

 
Off-road vehicles
Military light utility vehicles
Military trucks
Military vehicles of the United States
Lists of military vehicles